Durie Hill is a suburb of Whanganui, in the Whanganui District and Manawatū-Whanganui region of New Zealand's North Island.

The suburb was designed in 1920 by Samuel Hurst Seager as a garden suburb based on garden-city planning principles. It was designed with curvilinear streets, reserves, croquet lawns and tennis courts.

The Durie Hill Elevator connects the suburb with Anzac Parade. The elevator and tunnel were proposed by Wanganui Chronicle editor John Ball and Technical School engineering instructor Edward Crow, but most residents of the new suburb refused to fund it.

A revitalisation programme was launched in 2019, including the introduction of planter boxes and the founding of a village market.

Demographics

There were 900 households. There were 1,041 males and 1,089 females, giving a sex ratio of 0.96 males per female. The median age was 46.4 years (compared with 37.4 years nationally), with 375 people (17.6%) aged under 15 years, 297 (13.9%) aged 15 to 29, 1,011 (47.5%) aged 30 to 64, and 447 (21.0%) aged 65 or older.

Ethnicities were 89.0% European/Pākehā, 17.2% Māori, 1.7% Pacific peoples, 3.4% Asian, and 2.0% other ethnicities (totals add to more than 100% since people could identify with multiple ethnicities).

The proportion of people born overseas was 16.2%, compared with 27.1% nationally.

Although some people objected to giving their religion, 52.5% had no religion, 35.9% were Christian, 0.4% were Hindu, 0.7% were Muslim, 0.6% were Buddhist and 3.7% had other religions.

Of those at least 15 years old, 420 (23.9%) people had a bachelor or higher degree, and 264 (15.0%) people had no formal qualifications. The median income was $33,100, compared with $31,800 nationally. The employment status of those at least 15 was that 879 (50.1%) people were employed full-time, 267 (15.2%) were part-time, and 48 (2.7%) were unemployed.

Education

References 

Suburbs of Whanganui